Cydalima is a genus of moths of the Crambidae: Spilomelinae subfamily.

Species
Cydalima capriniodes (Hampson, 1912)
Cydalima decipiens (Hampson, 1912)
Cydalima diaphanalis (Walker, 1866)
Cydalima joiceyi (Janse, 1924)
Cydalima laticostalis (Guenée, 1854)
Cydalima mysteris Meyrick, 1886
Cydalima perspectalis (Walker, 1859) – box tree moth
Cydalima pfeifferae (Lederer, 1863)
Cydalima violalis E. Hering, 1901

References

Spilomelinae
Crambidae genera
Taxa named by Julius Lederer